IGP can refer to:

 IGP, online gifting retailer in India
 The Immediate Gratification Players, a Harvard University improvisational comedy troupe
 Indian Gandhiyan Party, a political party in Kerala, India
 Indication géographique protégée (protected geographical indication), food certification of the European Union
 Indication géographique protégée (Switzerland), food certification of Switzerland
 Inspector General of Police, a high rank of police officer; in some countries the highest rank
 Inspector General of Nepal Police, the highest rank of law enforcement agencies and paramilitary force in Nepal.
 Integrated graphics processor, a graphics processing unit
 Interior gateway protocol, an Internet protocol between routers
 Intraguild predation, an ecological concept describing predatory interactions between competing species
 Inverse Galois problem, an open problem in mathematics